Sphingomyelin phosphodiesterase D (EC 3.1.4.41, sphingomyelinase D) is an enzyme of the sphingomyelin phosphodiesterase family with systematic name sphingomyelin ceramide-phosphohydrolase. These enzymes catalyse the hydrolysis of sphingomyelin, resulting in the formation of ceramide 1-phosphate and choline: 
 sphingomyelin + H2O  ceramide 1-phosphate + choline 
or the hydrolysis of 2-lysophosphatidylcholine to give choline and 2-lysophosphatidate. Sphingomyelin phosphodiesterase D activity is shared by enzymes with a wider substrate range, classified as phospholipases D or lipophosphodiesterase II . Sphingomyelinases D are produced by some spiders in their venoms, specifically the brown recluse (Loxosceles reclusa), by arthropods such as ticks, or pathogenic bacteria and fungi. Pathogenicity is expressed through different mechanisms, such as membrane destabilization, cell penetration, inflammation of the lungs and cutaneous lesions, common following brown recluse spider bites.

See also 
 Sphingomyelin phosphodiesterase

References

External links 
 
 http://www.arachnoserver.org/toxincard.html?id=138

EC 3.1.4